The 2020 Copa Sudamericana final stages were played from 24 November 2020 to 23 January 2021. A total of 16 teams competed in the final stages to decide the champions of the 2020 Copa Sudamericana, with the final played in Córdoba, Argentina at the Estadio Mario Alberto Kempes.

The final stages had been originally scheduled to be played from 21 July to 7 November 2020, but were postponed due to the COVID-19 pandemic.

Qualified teams
The 16 winners of the second stage advanced to the round of 16.

Seeding

Starting from the round of 16, the teams are seeded according to the second stage draw, with each team assigned a "seed" 1–16 corresponding to the tie they win (O1–O16) (Regulations Article 2.2.2.1).

Format

Starting from the round of 16, the teams play a single-elimination tournament with the following rules:
In the round of 16, quarterfinals, and semifinals, each tie is played on a home-and-away two-legged basis, with the higher-seeded team hosting the second leg (Regulations Article 2.2.2). If tied on aggregate, the away goals rule will be used. If still tied, extra time will not be played, and a penalty shoot-out will be used to determine the winner (Regulations Article 2.4.2).
The final is played as a single match at a venue pre-selected by CONMEBOL, with the higher-seeded team designated as the "home" team for administrative purposes (Regulations Article 2.2.2.3). If tied after regulation, 30 minutes of extra time will be played. If still tied after extra time, a penalty shoot-out will be used to determine the winner (Regulations Article 2.4.3).

Bracket
The bracket starting from the round of 16 is determined as follows:

The bracket was decided based on the second stage draw, which was held on 23 October 2020.

Round of 16
The first legs were played on 24–26 November, and the second legs were played on 1–3 December 2020.

|}

Match A

Independiente won 5–1 on aggregate and advanced to the quarter-finals (Match S1).

Match B

Bahia won 1–0 on aggregate and advanced to the quarter-finals (Match S2).

Match C

Tied 3–3 on aggregate, Junior won on penalties and advanced to the quarter-finals (Match S3).

Match D

Tied 2–2 on aggregate, Universidad Católica won on away goals and advanced to the quarter-finals (Match S4).

Match E

Vélez Sarsfield won 7–1 on aggregate and advanced to the quarter-finals (Match S4).

Match F

Coquimbo Unido won 2–0 on aggregate and advanced to the quarter-finals (Match S3).

Match G

Defensa y Justicia won 2–1 on aggregate and advanced to the quarter-finals (Match S2).

Match H

Lanús won 7–4 on aggregate and advanced to the quarter-finals (Match S1).

Quarter-finals
The first legs were played on 8–10 December, and the second legs were played on 15–17 December 2020.

|}

Match S1

Lanús won 3–1 on aggregate and advanced to the semi-finals (Match F1).

Match S2

Defensa y Justicia won 4–2 on aggregate and advanced to the semi-finals (Match F2).

Match S3

Tied 2–2 on aggregate, Coquimbo Unido won on away goals and advanced to the semi-finals (Match F2).

Match S4

Vélez Sarsfield won 4–3 on aggregate and advanced to the semi-finals (Match F1).

Semi-finals
The first legs were played on 6 & 12 January 2021, and the second legs were played on 13 & 16 January 2021.

|}

Match F1

Lanús won 4–0 on aggregate and advanced to the final.

Match F2

Defensa y Justicia won 4–2 on aggregate and advanced to the final.

Final

The final was played on 23 January 2021 at the Estadio Mario Alberto Kempes in Córdoba.

Notes

References

External links
CONMEBOL Sudamericana 2020, CONMEBOL.com

3
November 2020 sports events in South America
December 2020 sports events in South America
January 2021 sports events in South America